Valberto Amorim dos Santos (born March 16, 1973 in Santos), or simply Beto,  is a Brazilian defensive midfielder for Paraná in the Brazilian Série A.

Contract
9 April 2006 to 9 April 2008

External links

CBF  

Placar  

1973 births
Living people
Sportspeople from Santos, São Paulo
Brazilian footballers
Brazilian expatriate footballers
Montedio Yamagata players
Sociedade Esportiva do Gama players
Albirex Niigata players
Paraná Clube players
C.F. Os Belenenses players
Campeonato Brasileiro Série A players
J2 League players
Japan Football League (1992–1998) players
Expatriate footballers in Japan
Expatriate footballers in Portugal
Association football midfielders